Bela chuni is a species of sea snail, a marine gastropod mollusk in the family Mangeliidae.

According to the World Register of Marine Species,  Bela (Acrobela) sansibarica Thiele, J., 1925 is a synonym of Microdrillia sansibarica (Thiele, 1925)

Distribution
This marine species occurs off Zanzibar.

References

 Thiele, J. 1925. Gastropoda der Deutschen Tiefsee-Expedition, 11. Wiss. Ergebn. dt. Tiefsee Exped. 'Valdivia' 17(2): 37-382

External links
  Bouchet P., Kantor Yu.I., Sysoev A. & Puillandre N. (2011) A new operational classification of the Conoidea. Journal of Molluscan Studies 77: 273-308.
  Tucker, J.K. 2004 Catalog of recent and fossil turrids (Mollusca: Gastropoda). Zootaxa 682:1-1295.

chuni
Gastropods described in 1925